Micrococca scariosa is a species of plant in the family Euphorbiaceae. It is found in Kenya and Tanzania.

References

Acalypheae
Vulnerable plants
Taxonomy articles created by Polbot